The first season of MTV's reality dating series Are You the One?, filmed in Kauai, Hawaii, premiered on MTV on January 21, 2014.

Cast

Progress 

Notes
 Unconfirmed Perfect Match

In Week 5, Ryan Awarded the house two Truth Booths, which gave the house their first perfect match in Dillan and Coleysia.

MTV.com Clue

Truth Booths

 
Week 9: Wes and Kayla didn't win the challenge. But Ryan Devlin mixed things up saying that the members not going on the dates would be the ones up for the truth booth.
Week 10: Dre was the ultimate winner of the massage challenge, therefore he was given the power to either send himself with a woman of his choosing or he could choose 2 others from the previous ceremony to send to the truth booth. He ultimately chose John and Jacy who were not a match.

Episodes

After filming

Baby Special and Reunion 
Baby Special and Reunion aired on September 29, 2014. During this reunion, the gender of Ethan and Amber's baby was revealed to be a girl. Both parents-to-be got emotional when they found out they were having a girl. There were also conflicts between Scali and Jacy, Shanley and Chris T, and Ryan and Adam. The end of the episode resulted in most conflicts being resolved. Jacy stated that she would be moving to New York (where Scali is currently based) and they would take their relationship from there. Brittany told the camera that she would be taking Ryan home to meet her parents.

Shanley McIntee appeared on the first season of the American version of Ex on the Beach.

The Challenge

References

Are You the One?
2014 American television seasons